Henry Lyttelton Alexander Hood, 8th Viscount Hood (born 16 March 1958), is a British peer and solicitor. He succeeded to the viscountcy on 2 October 1999, after the death of his father, Alexander Hood, 7th Viscount Hood.

His mother, Diana Maud Lyttelton (1920–2008), was the second daughter of George Lyttelton of the Lyttelton family (Viscounts Cobham), thus making Lord Hood a nephew of noted entertainer Humphrey Lyttelton. Not long after succeeding his father to the title, he lost his seat in the House of Lords due to the House of Lords Act 1999 which removed all but 92 hereditary peers. He most recently stood as a crossbencher in the 2018 by-election following the retirement of the Earl Baldwin of Bewdley and came sixth.

Lord Hood married Flora Casement in 1991. The Viscountess is a maternal cousin of actor Hugh Grant. The couple have three sons and two daughters.

Lord Hood was educated at Eton College and obtained a Master of Arts (Scotland) degree at the University of Edinburgh before gaining law qualifications at the College of Law in 1987. He is a well-established practising solicitor specialising in family law and mediation and heads the Family Law department at Hunters in the City of London.

References

External links

1958 births
Living people
Viscounts in the Peerage of Great Britain
Lyttelton family
Alumni of the University of Edinburgh
People educated at Eton College
English solicitors
Henry

Hood